Rodeo is one of the 39 municipalities of Durango, in north-western Mexico. The municipal seat lies at Rodeo. The municipality covers an area of 1,854.9 km².

As of 2010, the municipality had a total population of 12,788, up from 11,231 as of 2005. 

As of 2010, the town of Rodeo had a population of 4,666. Other than the town of Rodeo, the municipality had 71 localities, the largest of which (with 2010 population in parentheses) was: Abasolo (1,208), classified as rural.

References

Municipalities of Durango